Clarke Brothers Bank was a Manhattan, New York based financial institution located at 154 Nassau Street that failed in June 1929. Park Row Trust Company, which opened in March 1930, was located on the same site as Clarke Brothers Bank. Four members of the bankrupt private bank were indicted for mail fraud in connection with the failure of the business. The bank's insolvency was initially figured at $5,000,000.

Directors of Irving Trust Company, which was appointed receiver when the bank passed into receivership, estimated the loss as $3,811,364. This was $1,200,000 less than the original figure.

References

Companies based in New York City
History of New York City
Banks disestablished in 1929
Defunct banks of the United States
Defunct companies based in New York (state)
American companies disestablished in 1929
1929 disestablishments in New York (state)